Bon Tut (also Romanized as Bon Tūt) is a village in Jowzam Rural District, Dehaj District, Shahr-e Babak County, Kerman Province, Iran. At the 2006 census, its population was 40, in 18 families.

References 

Populated places in Shahr-e Babak County